Françoise Burdet (born 12 August 1967) is a Swiss bobsledder who competed from 1992 to 2005. She won two medals in the two-woman event at the FIBT World Championships with a gold in 2001 and a bronze in 2000.

Burdet won the Bobsleigh World Cup season titles four straight years in the two-woman event (199596, 199697, 199798, 199899).

She also finished fourth in the two-woman event at the 2002 Winter Olympics in Salt Lake City.

References
2002 bobsleigh two-woman results
Bobsleigh two-woman world championship medalists since 2000
FIBT profile
List of two-woman bobsleigh World Cup champions since 1995

1967 births
Bobsledders at the 2002 Winter Olympics
Living people
Swiss female bobsledders
Olympic bobsledders of Switzerland
21st-century Swiss women